Labour Party of Turkey (in Turkish: Türkiye Emekçi Partisi) was a political party in Turkey. TEP was founded in 1975. The programme of TEP was 'National Democratic Revolution'. It published Emekçi.

TEP was dissolved in the mid-1980s.

Defunct communist parties in Turkey
Political parties established in 1975